Bendungan Hilir Station is a rapid transit station on the North-South Line of the Jakarta MRT. It is located at Jalan Jenderal Sudirman, at the border between Karet Tengsin, Tanah Abang in Central Jakarta and Karet Semanggi, Setiabudi in South Jakarta, and has the station code BNH.

History 

Station layout

References

External links
 
  

South Jakarta
Jakarta MRT stations
railway stations opened in 2019